In Madrid, Metrobús is the name given to the ticket that allows to travel 10 times inside of the bus and Metro system of the city.

Fares

References

Transport in Madrid
Madrid Metro